Australians in American football include not just a number of successful football code converts, but also a number of players with high profiles either before or as a result of their switching codes.

In Australia, there is an almost equal fascination, among the media and general public, of players linked to the National Football League (NFL) as there is for the Irish experiment.

Although Australians have participated at the highest level of American football, since the success of Darren Bennett as a punter and more recently Ben Graham, several athletes from Australian rules football, rugby league and rugby union have been linked to potential NFL careers.

The punting specialist position requires similar skills to those used in Australian Rules football.  Salaries are up to five times higher and the position lends itself to longevity: Australian football players generally retire at around 30, whereas American football punters can play well into their 40s (in fact, one of the players listed below, Darren Bennett, played 11 seasons in the NFL after leaving behind an Australian rules career when he was nearing 30). Initially Australians sought out American football careers, although now NFL scouts are more often actively seeking punters from Australia.

The first Australian to play American Football at a meaningful level was former Australian rules footballer Pat O'Dea in 1898 who was a College Football Hall of Fame player.

Gridiron in Australia is only at amateur level, so the pathway for Australians to NFL teams is typically limited to other professional Australian sports.  For almost a decade, the NFL has placed full-time development officers in Australia, including Australian rules football hopeful Dwayne Armstrong. There is a full-time punting academy in Australia, Prokick Australia, run by former NFL free agent Nathan Chapman, which is aimed at training and assessing talented punters from Australia for positions in major U.S. colleges and the NFL.

More recently, the Ray Guy Award, presented to the top punter in NCAA Division I FBS football, was won by Australians six times in the last seven seasons of the 2010s—by Tom Hornsey in 2013, Tom Hackett in 2014 and 2015, Mitch Wishnowsky in 2016, Michael Dickson in 2017, and Max Duffy in 2019. Hornsey played for the University of Memphis, Hackett and Wishnowsky for the University of Utah, Dickson for the University of Texas, and Duffy for the University of Kentucky. In the 2018 season, 30 FBS teams and about 35 teams in the second-tier Division I FCS had Australian punters.

Australian sportsmen recruited by NFL teams
a) brought to the US by an NFL team
b) spent time training with an NFL team
c) played in an NFL pre-season game
d) offered an NFL contract by a team
e) spent time on an NFL roster

Professional Australian sportsmen trialled with NFL clubs
 Max Duffy (2021 - Denver Broncos)
 Anthony Rocca (2010)
 Nick Davis (2008)
 Nathan Chapman (2004)
 Wayne Carey (2002 – Dallas Cowboys)
 Richard Osborne (1994)
 Tony Campbell (1994)
 Mark Harris (1973)

Professional Australian sportsmen public stating an interest in switching to NFL
(either during or after their Australian professional careers)
 Dustin Martin Dustin "Dusty" Martin was thinking of switching sports to go play overseas NFL. He thought about being a Quarterback in early 2015
 Jarryd Hayne
 Scott Harding
 Brendan Fevola
 Anthony Rocca
 Dustin Fletcher
 Cory Paterson
 Todd Carney
 Willie Mason
 Trent Croad
 Paul Wheatley
 Greg Inglis
 Josh Hunt

Female players of American football
Jacinda Barclay
Richelle Cranston

References